The 2020 KNSB Dutch Single Distance Championships were held at the Thialf skating rink in Heerenveen from Friday 27 December 2019 to Sunday 29 December 2019. Although the tournament was held in 2019 it was the 2020 edition as it was part of the 2019–2020 speed skating season.

Schedule

Medalists

Men

Women

References

External links
 KNSB

Dutch Single Distance Championships
Single Distance Championships
2020 Single Distance
KNSB Dutch Single Distance Championships, 2020